Serra do Bussaco is a mountain range in Portugal, formerly included in the province of Beira Litoral. The highest point in the range is the Cruz Alta at 549 m (1801 feet), which has views over the Serra da Estrela, the Mondego River valley and the Atlantic Ocean.

The Serra includes the buildings of a secularized Carmelite monastery, founded in 1628. The convent woods have long been known for their cypress, plane, evergreen oak, cork and other forest trees, many of which have stood for centuries and attained an immense size. A bull of Pope Gregory XV (1623), anathematizing trespassers and forbidding women to approach, is inscribed on a tablet at the main entrance; another bull, of Pope Urban VIII (1643), threatens with excommunication any person harming the trees. Located in the northwestern corner is the Mata Nacional do Bussaco (Bussaco Forest), an ancient walled arboretum.

Towards the close of the 19th century the Serra de Bussaco became one of the regular halting-places for foreign, and especially for British, tourists, on the overland route between Lisbon and Porto. The Palace Hotel of Bussaco (Palácio Hotel do Bussaco), built between 1888 and 1905 in an exuberant Neo-Manueline style, still attracts tourists.

In 1873 a monument was erected, on the southern slopes of the Serra, to commemorate the Battle of Bussaco, in which the French, under Marshal Masséna, were defeated by the Anglo-Portuguese Army, under Lord Wellington, on 27 September 1810.

References

Mountain ranges of Portugal